Abergele (Amharic: አበርገሌ) is one of the woredas in the Amhara Region of Ethiopia. The capital and main town of the woreda is Nirak. Part of the Wag Hemra Zone, Abergele is bordered on the south by Zikuala, on the southwest by Sehala, on the northwest by the Semien (North) Gondar Zone, on the north and east by the Tigray Region, and on the southeast by Soqota. Abergele was separated from the Soqota administrative division.

The district should not be confounded with the neighbouring Abergele (woreda) in Tigray region.

Demographics
Based on the 2007 national census conducted by the Central Statistical Agency of Ethiopia (CSA), this woreda has a total population of 43,191, of whom 21,976 are men and 21,215 women; none are urban inhabitants. The majority of the inhabitants practiced Ethiopian Orthodox Christianity, with 99.93% reporting that as their religion.

History

21st century

Notes

Districts of Amhara Region